Graeme Hawley (born 24 February 1975) is an English actor. He is best known for his roles as John Stape in the British soap Coronation Street Emmerdale First as Dave then as DC Martin Crowe and Shamless as Troy Lawson

Career
Hawley graduated from Manchester Metropolitan University in 1996 with a degree in drama, before beginning his acting career in the theatre.

He started his career off by performing on stage at the Concordia Theatre, Hinckley, Leicestershire whilst learning the craft of acting with Priscilla Morris at the Hinckley Speech & Drama Studio (HSDS). His credits have so far included police officer Martin Crowe in ITV's Emmerdale, as well as roles in Shameless (Channel 4) and A Touch of Frost (ITV). He played John Stape in the long-running soap opera Coronation Street from March 2007 to January 2008, and then returned to the role in June 2008, but then left again. Hawley once again reprised the role in March 2009. On 28 October 2011, his character died after confessing to causing the death of three other people - Colin Fishwick, Charlotte Hoyle and Joy Fishwick.

On 29 May 2012, it was announced that Hawley would be playing the role of Satan in the York Mystery Plays 2012. The plays were staged during August that year. The same month, he also appeared as Dave Tandy in the sitcom In with the Flynns.

Personal life

Hawley currently lives in Manchester with his wife Elianne Byrne, who is an actress. They have a daughter named Audrey (born June 2009) and a son named Henry (born in May 2011).  He is a lifelong supporter of Coventry City F.C.

Television

Theatre

References

External links 

Living people
1973 births
Actors from Coventry
Alumni of Manchester Metropolitan University
English male soap opera actors